Bradbeer is a surname. Notable people with the surname include:

Godwin Bradbeer (born 1950), New Zealand-born Australian artist
James Bradbeer (1880–1937), British golfer

See also
 Bradberry

English-language surnames